Robert Duncan McNeill (born November 9, 1964) is an American director, producer, and actor. As an actor, he is best known for his role as Lieutenant Tom Paris on the television series Star Trek: Voyager. He has also served as an executive producer and frequent director of the television series Chuck, Resident Alien, The Gifted, and Turner & Hooch.

Personal life
McNeill and his first wife, Carol, had three children together before their 2015 divorce. In 2005, McNeill directed his then teenaged daughter, Taylor, when she had a small role in the episode "The Pleiades" of the series Summerland. His son Kyle is a singer songwriter. McNeill married Rebecca Jayne Sims in Vancouver, Canada, on March 7, 2021.

Career

Acting
McNeill grew up in Atlanta, and began his career acting in local and regional productions before becoming a student at Juilliard School in New York City. He enjoyed early success as a professional actor, winning the role of Charlie Brent on All My Children and starring in the feature film Masters of the Universe.  He also starred in an episode of the 1980s version of The Twilight Zone, "A Message From Charity". He then appeared with Stockard Channing in the Broadway production of Six Degrees of Separation before returning to Los Angeles to pursue roles on television. He appeared in featured guest roles on numerous TV series, including L.A. Law; Quantum Leap; and Murder, She Wrote. He was a featured cast member on the short-lived 1992 series Going to Extremes, Another guest role that same year was in "The First Duty", an episode of Star Trek: The Next Generation, in which he played Nick Locarno, a Starfleet Academy cadet and squad leader who pressures fellow cadet Wesley Crusher into covering up their wrongdoings. He would later become a Trek regular in 1995 on Star Trek: Voyager, on which he played Tom Paris, a Starfleet officer with a backstory similar to Locarno's. Other credits include Zebulon in "Joseph and the Amazing Technicolor Dreamcoat" at the Paper Mill Playhouse and Judas in "Godspell" at the Lamb's Theatre.

Directing

McNeill began his directing career with several episodes of Voyager. He then wrote, produced, and directed two award-winning short films, The Battery and 9mm of Love, and began to direct other episodic television shows. While he has since performed as a guest star on television shows such as The Outer Limits and Crossing Jordan, McNeill is now focusing on his directing career, helming episodes of Dawson's Creek, Everwood, Star Trek: Enterprise, Dead Like Me, The O.C., One Tree Hill, Las Vegas, Summerland, and Supernatural. His directing credits for 2006–2007 include episodes of Desperate Housewives, Medium, Standoff, The Nine, The Knights of Prosperity, In Case of Emergency, What About Brian, and My Boys. In 2007, he directed the season 5 premiere of Las Vegas, the pilot of Samantha Who? (which features his Star Trek: Voyager costar Tim Russ) and then signed on as a producer-director of the NBC show Chuck, helming numerous episodes, including the first episode of a television show to be broadcast entirely in 3D. In 2010, McNeill directed an episode of V, an ABC science fiction television series produced by Scott Rosenbaum, a former writer and executive producer on Chuck.  As of 2019 he has directed two episodes of the Fox series The Orville and The Gifted. In 2021, McNeill directed several episodes of the Disney+ series Turner & Hooch.

Filmography

Films

Television

Video Games

References

External links

 
 
 

1964 births
20th-century American male actors
21st-century American male actors
American male film actors
American male television actors
American podcasters
American television directors
Juilliard School alumni
Living people
Male actors from North Carolina